National Secondary Route 116, or just Route 116 (or ) is a National Road Route of Costa Rica, located in the Heredia province.

Description
In Heredia province the route covers Santo Domingo canton (Santo Domingo, Santo Tomás, Tures districts), San Rafael canton (San Rafael, Concepción districts), San Isidro canton (San Isidro district).

References

Highways in Costa Rica